Taibo (circa 1150 BCE), or Wu Taibo, was the eldest son of King Tai of Zhou and the legendary founder of the State of Wu. His exact birth and death dates are unknown.

Biography
According to Sima Qian, Taibo was the founder of the State of Wu.

Born into the Jī clan of predynastic Zhou, Taibo was the eldest son of King Tai of Zhou. He had two younger brothers, Zhongyong and Jili. The King of Zhou wished to make his youngest son Jili to inherit the reins of power, so Taibo and Zhongyong traveled southeast and settled in Meili in present-day Jiangsu province. There, Taibo and his followers set up the State of Wu, and made Meili its capital. Taibo's grand-nephew, King Wu of Zhou, overthrew the Shang dynasty and started the Zhou dynasty. However, the tale of Taibo being the founder of the State of Wu is disputed.

During his reign, Taibo developed irrigation, encouraged agriculture, and dug Taibo River (泰伯瀆) which is called Bodu River (伯瀆河) today. When Taibo died, he had no heir and passed the throne to his younger brother Zhongyong. Taibo's shrine was set up in today's Meicun. Although the original wood structure was destroyed during later wars, it has been renovated several times. Present architecture is mostly from the Qing dynasty. A stone carved with Confucius's comment can still be seen in today's Taibo Shrine. Taibo is also customarily known as the propagator of all people with the surname Wu 吳.

After the conquest of Shang dynasty, King Wu of Zhou found Zhouzhang, a great-grandson of Zhongyong, and made him the King of Wu.

Connection to ancient Japan 
Ambassadorial visits to Japan by the later Chinese Cao Wei and Jin dynasties recorded that the Wajin people of Japan claimed to be descendants of Taibo of Wu. Several scholars suggest that the Yamato people and the Yamato dynasty are descendants of the Wu ruling clan and possibly Taibo.

References 

Shang dynasty people
Monarchs of Wu (state)
12th-century BC Chinese monarchs
Founding monarchs